John L. (Jack) Frazer OMM, MSC (December 20, 1931 – December 17, 2012) was a member of the House of Commons of Canada from 1993 to 1997. He was born in Kamloops, British Columbia.

In 1956, he married the former Millicent June Black.  Assigned to Fighter Controller duties in 1958, after completing the Fighter Controller course at Tyndal Air force Base, Florida, Frazer served at Radar Stations, Mont Apica, Quebec and Edgar Ontario before being selected to join the RCAF Golden Hawks aerobatic team at RCAF Chatham in 1961.  Flying with the Golden Hawks in 1961 and 1962, he flew in air shows across Canada and the United States before being selected to fly the CF-104 Starfighter.  After completing the Starfighter course at Cold Lake, Alberta, he was posted to RCAF Marville, France where he formed and commanded 439 Reconnaissance Squadron on the CF-104 at RCAF #1 Wing Marville, France from 1964 to 1967.  #1 Reconnaissance Wing Marville achieved a first when they earned a #1 rating on their first NATO Tactical Evaluation, a performance never achieved before or repeated since.  When Charles DeGaulle ordered NATO out of France and #1 Wing was to take over French Air Force Station Lahr, Germany, Frazer was named Commander of the Advance Party at Lahr and later returned to Marville as Commander of the Rear Party, closing the Station there.  Having completed the closure of Marville, Frazer returned to his duties as Deputy Operations Officer at RCAF Lahr which, despite the move again earned a #1 rating on the subsequent NATO Tactical Evaluation. 

In 1968 Major Frazer moved to Canadian Forces Headquarters in Ottawa as Secretary to the Director General Force Objectives.  The following year he was posted to Toronto to attend the RCAF Staff College. In 1970, he was posted to NATO Headquarters Allied Forces Northern Europe (HQ AFNORTH) at Kolsas, Norway as the Staff Officer Reconnaissance.

In 1973 he returned to CFB Chilliwack, B.C. as a Company Commander in the Canadian Forces Officer Candidate School and in 1974 was promoted Lieutenant Colonel to command  the school.

In 1976, he was assigned as Base Operations Officer at CFB Cold Lake Alberta where he oversaw flying operations there and was responsible for instituting the first Operation Maple Flag the multi-national exercise simulating an air war environment, which continues today.  Posted to 25 NORAD Region Headquarters at Mchord Air Force Base, Tacoma Washington in 1979, Frazer assumed his duties as Assistant Deputy for Operations.  A year later he was promoted Colonel and assigned as Base Commander and Deputy Commander #1 Canadian Air Group at CFB Baden Soellingen, Germany.  In 1983 Frazer was posted to Harare, Zimbabwe where, as Military Advisor/Attaché, he was accredited to Zimbabwe, Mozambique, Tanzania, Kenya, Uganda and Botswana. 

In 1985, while on a routine visit to Uganda a Coup d'état occurred deposing Milton Obote as president and creating chaos with extensive killing and looting.  After remaining in his hotel for four days, Frazer effected liaison with the British High Commission in Kampala and assisted in organizing the evacuation of the citizens of ten western nations from Uganda to Kenya.  For his actions in this organization dealing with a number of potentially dangerous situations during the evacuation, Colonel Frazer was awarded the Meritorious Service Cross. In 1986 Frazer and his wife returned to Canada where he built his home and retired on Salt Spring Island BC. Joining the Reform Party of Canada in 1988, Frazer was elected Saanich-Gulf Islands Reform Party of Canada Candidate for Parliament in 1993 and was elected Member Of Parliament for Saanich-Gulf Islands in the October election that year.  He served as Defence and Veterans Affairs Critic and Deputy Whip and sat on seven Parliamentary Committees during the 35th Parliament.
His Private Members Bill establishing the Canadian Peacekeeping Service Medal (CPSM) was passed into law on 5 April 1997.  After serving in the 35th Canadian Parliament, Frazer did not seek a second term in Parliament.

After the 1997 election when he left politics, Frazer was appointed to the Veterans Review and Appeal Board, operated by the federal government's Veterans Affairs Canada.

External links
 
Veterans Affairs Canada: New Member Added to Veterans' Board, accessed 8 August 2006

1931 births
2012 deaths
Members of the House of Commons of Canada from British Columbia
People from Kamloops
Reform Party of Canada MPs
Royal Canadian Air Force officers